"Mademoiselle" is the first single released from Styx's Crystal Ball album.  The B-side, "Lonely Child", was taken from the previous album, Equinox. It peaked at #36 on the Billboard magazine Hot 100 singles chart the week of December 25, 1976, becoming Styx's third top 40 hit. It also reached number 25 on the Canadian RPM singles chart on the week of January 22, 1977.

Cash Box said that "The group successfully borrows a strong Queen sound — the guitar and vocal harmonies sound especially familiar."

Personnel
Tommy Shaw – lead vocals, lead guitar
Dennis DeYoung – keyboards, backing vocals
James Young – rhythm guitar, backing vocals
Chuck Panozzo – bass 
John Panozzo – drums

References

1976 songs
1976 singles
Songs written by Dennis DeYoung
Styx (band) songs
A&M Records singles